Big School is a British sitcom, starring David Walliams, Catherine Tate, Steve Speirs, Frances de la Tour, Joanna Scanlan and Philip Glenister. It is set in a secondary school and follows the comedic relationships of the teachers. The first series began airing on BBC One on 16 August 2013, and was met with polarised reviews. The final episode of the first series aired on 20 September 2013. On 2 December 2013, BBC One controller Charlotte Moore announced that Big School had been renewed for a second and final series, which concluded on 10 October 2014. In June 2015, it was officially announced that Big School would not be returning for a third series.

Plot
The series follows Keith Church (David Walliams), a socially naive chemistry teacher at the fictional Greybridge Secondary School, near Watford, who falls for new French teacher Sarah Postern (Catherine Tate), who believes herself to be an inspirational teacher, in tune with youth culture and a beautiful woman. However, she is also getting attention from the arrogant and rude sports teacher Trevor Gunn (Philip Glenister). Other staff members include Ms Baron (Frances de la Tour) as the alcoholic 'no nonsense' headteacher, Mr Martin (Daniel Rigby), a music teacher with ambitions to be a singer-songwriter, Mr Barber (Steve Speirs), a geography teacher who is having a nervous breakdown and is employed as a caretaker in the second series and Mr Hubble (James Greene), the elderly and unwell head of science. The pupils at the school are portrayed as being mainly interested in social networking, texting and partying and as being bored by the attempts of Mr Church and Miss Postern to engage with them. The most prominent of them in the first series is a streetwise pupil called Manyou, played by Joivan Wade, who is asked for advice on how to succeed with women by Mr Church.

Production
The show was written by David Walliams (who had previously produced Little Britain), along with Dawson Bros., and directed by Tony Dow. Many scenes for the series were shot at Bishopshalt School, Hillingdon, West London. The pupils gave up their school holidays to come to the school and be extras. Other inside shots were filmed at Pinewood Studios in Buckinghamshire. The titles were scrapped in Series 2 and were replaced by simple text at the centre of the screen.

Cast

Guest characters

Episodes

Series overview

Series 1 (2013)

Series 2 (2014)

Reception
The series was met with mixed feedback. Dan Owen of MSN described it as "An amusing and pleasant way to spend 30 minutes", and The Guardian said of Walliams: "This performance, and his writing, gives the show good jokes and heart."

There was negative feedback to the opening of the series, with The Daily Telegraph stating: "A bit tired, perhaps, the school thing, but surely a straightforward setting for a sitcom" before concluding "Let's just put it this way: amusing it was not. Mission aborted." MSN UK said, "Like most BBC comedies aiming to please mass audiences, there were plenty of moments that didn't work, but the writing avoided being outright terrible. A family show like this (even one inexplicably broadcast post-watershed) simply can't please everyone all the time".

The series opened to 4.2m viewers. The second instalment scored 3.63m (17.4%) for BBC One, making it the most watched programme of prime time outside of the soaps and news for the night.

DVD release
The first series of Big School was released on DVD on 23 September 2013.

The second and final series was released on DVD on 13 October 2014.

References

External links

2010s British sitcoms
2010s British workplace comedy television series
2013 British television series debuts
2014 British television series endings
BBC television sitcoms
British high school television series
English-language television shows
Television series about educators